The 2011–12 Ottawa Senators season was the 20th season of the Ottawa Senators of the National Hockey League (NHL). It was considered a rebuilding season for the Senators after an off-season of high player personnel turnover and the hiring of a new head coach. Although the Senators were not expected to make the playoffs, the team qualified eighth. The team lost, however, in the first round to the first-place New York Rangers, although they took the series to a seventh game. Three Senators were nominated for NHL awards: captain Daniel Alfredsson for the Bill Masterton Memorial Trophy, Erik Karlsson for the James Norris Trophy and Head Coach Paul MacLean for the Jack Adams Award. The Senators hosted the NHL All-Star Game and its festivities. Alfredsson was named captain of one of the teams and five Senators played in the Game.

Team business
On May 19, 2011, the Ottawa Senators were awarded the Ottawa United Way Community Builder of the Year Award for over $60 million in charitable fund-raising in the past ten years, support of youth hockey and the founding of the "Do It For Daron" initiative for mental health in honour of Daron Richardson, the daughter of Ottawa Senators assistant coach Luke Richardson, who took her own life in November 2010. On May 20, 2011, the Senators announced the "Rink of Dreams" project to build an outdoor skating rink at Ottawa City Hall. The rink is to cost $1.25 million, $1 million of which would be funded by the Senators Foundation charity.

In December 2011, the Senators officially announced the replacement of the scoreboard at Scotiabank Place. The old scoreboard dated from 1996, and its replacement had been rumoured in the media since the time of the announcement that the All-Star Game would be played in the arena. The new scoreboard, to be supplied by Panasonic, uses four high-definition video screens, plus two LED "rings", one above the scoreboards and one below. While the old scoreboard had video screens, the new screens are much larger in size and have a larger number of pixels per screen. The scoreboard was first used for the December 27, 2011, game against the Montreal Canadiens. For the game, only the four video screens were in place; the LED rings were to be operational for the All-Star Game.

2012 NHL All-Star Game
The Senators were the hosts of the 58th NHL All-Star Game in January 2012. The Ottawa Convention Centre hosted a Fan Fair of fan activities from the Thursday until Saturday. The Rideau Canal had to close due to mild weather, but the Senators' new Rink of Dreams was able to be used in its place. Confederation Park was used for ice sculptures and displays.

In the annual All-Star Game voting, Senators fans voted four members of the team to the All-Star roster: Daniel Alfredsson, Erik Karlsson, Milan Michalek and Jason Spezza. Karlsson led all players in voting with over 939,591 votes cast. Colin Greening was added later by the NHL operations department. Alfredsson was named captain of one team and was able to put the Senators onto his team, except for Greening, who was selected at random for the other All-Star team, coached by former Senator Zdeno Chara. Senators' fans in attendance at the game were thrilled when Alfredsson scored two consecutive goals in the second period, giving him a standing ovation.

Off-season
After firing Head Coach Cory Clouston at the end of their 2010–11 season, the Senators began a search for a new head coach. According to media reports, Bryan Murray interviewed several candidates for the job, including Kurt Kleinendorst (coach of the Binghamton Senators), Dave Cameron (coach of the Mississauga St. Michael's Majors), Craig MacTavish (former coach of the Edmonton Oilers), Paul MacLean (assistant coach of the Detroit Red Wings) and Kirk Muller (assistant coach of the Montreal Canadiens). On June 14, 2011, the Senators announced the signing of Paul MacLean to a three-year contract as the new head coach. On June 23, 2011, Dave Cameron and Mark Reeds were hired as his assistant coaches. Reeds was the head coach of the Owen Sound Attack from the Ontario Hockey League (OHL).

The Senators unveiled a new third jersey on October 1, 2011. The new third jersey replaces the "SENS" design third jersey. The New Jersey is primarily black, with horizontal red and off-white stripes in a pattern reminiscent of the original Ottawa Senators jersey of 1926–27. The team will wear the jersey 11 times at home and once on the road. The symbolism of the number 11 corresponds to the number of Stanley Cup championships the original Senators won.

Pre-season
On June 22, 2011, the Senators announced that they would be playing seven games during the pre-season – three games at home, three games on the road and one neutral-site game. The team will play divisional rivals Toronto, Montreal and Boston twice each. Meanwhile, the Senators will also play the Winnipeg Jets once in Conception Bay South, Newfoundland, as part of the Kraft Hockeyville Celebrations. The game was moved to Mile One Centre by Conception Bay South to maximize the use of arena upgrade dollars for renovations, instead of preparing their arena for the exhibition game.

The Senators held a rookie camp in early September. The rookies participated in a rookie tournament in Oshawa, Ontario, with rookies of the Chicago Blackhawks, Pittsburgh Penguins and Toronto Maple Leafs. The team won all of its games in the tournament. All members of the rookie camp were invited to the main training camp, which started on September 16 at Scotiabank Place and the Bell Sensplex.

Regular season

The Senators opened the season on October 7, 2011, at the Detroit Red Wings. The Senators finished the season on April 7, 2012. 81 of 82 games were televised, either on CBC, RDS, Sportsnet, TSN or TVA. The sole game not televised was a visit to the Florida Panthers on February 15, 2012. The NHL later organized a video feed available to NHL Centre Ice subscribers in Ottawa for the Panthers game.

The Senators had their home opener on October 11, 2011, against the Minnesota Wild. Since it is the franchise's 20th anniversary season, the Senators had special celebrations. With 14 members of the 1992–93 team in attendance, Laurie Boschman, the 1992–93 team's captain, dropped the puck on the ceremonial face-off. The team went on to win the game 4–3 via shoot-out. It was head coach Paul MacLean's first win as a head coach in the NHL.

Nikita Filatov, a 21-year-old Russian player (and former first-round pick) acquired in a trade at the 2011 NHL Entry Draft, had an up-and-down season between Ottawa and Binghamton before being loaned to CKSA Moscow of the Kontinental Hockey League (KHL) in December; he played for CSKA for the remainder of the season. Filatov was to be a restricted free agent at the end of the season, and general manager Bryan Murray indicated that the club had not given up on Filatov, and would put in at least a qualifying offer at season's end.

The Senators made a trade in December 2011 for the Phoenix Coyotes' Kyle Turris in exchange for David Rundblad and a draft pick. After Turris arrived in Ottawa, the team won ten of 13 games, and had a nine-game unbeaten streak over the end of December into January. The run pushed the Senators up into a playoff position. On December 17, the Senators were in tenth position. On January 20, the Senators were as high as fourth in the Eastern Conference.

In February, goaltender Craig Anderson cut the pinky finger on his right hand while preparing food at home. The injury put him out of action as the cut made him unable to hold the goal stick while the injury healed. The Senators made a trade to improve the organizational depth at goaltender, trading for Ben Bishop of the St. Louis Blues. Bishop was playing for the Blues' American Hockey League (AHL) affiliate and was due to become an unrestricted free agent. Bishop had won the MVP award at the AHL 2012 All-Star Game and was considered one of the best prospects outside the NHL. Before the trade, the Senators had recalled Robin Lehner from Binghamton and Bishop reported to Binghamton. Although Lehner played well and earned his first NHL shutout, Lehner was sent to Binghamton in early March and Bishop recalled to Ottawa. While Ottawa continued to earn points, division leader Boston struggled, and the Senators found winning the division feasible. On March 16, the Senators moved past the Bruins into first place in the Northeast Division and second overall in the Eastern Conference. The lead lasted one day, but the Senators qualified for the playoffs, an unexpected development that made head coach MacLean a candidate for coach of the year.

Playoffs
The Senators succeeded in making the playoffs after missing them in the 2010–11 season, with a 5–1 win over the New York Islanders on April 1, 2012. The Hockey News had predicted that the Senators would finish last in the Eastern Conference and miss the playoffs.

Senators vs. Rangers
The Senators qualified in eighth place, drawing the first-place New York Rangers in the first round. Although the Senators won three out of four games during the regular season between the two teams, the NHL Network predicted the Rangers will win in five or six games. ESPN predicted the Rangers would win in seven games. It was the first New York–Ottawa series since the first Senators played the Rangers in 1927–28, and the last until 2016-17.

In the first game, the Rangers scored once in the first, and twice in the second to take a 3–0 lead into the third period. In the third, the Rangers scored to make it 4–0 before Daniel Alfredsson and Erik Condra scored in the last ten minutes. It was close until the middle of the game. The Rangers were leading 1–0 late in the second period and the Senators were pressing for an equalizer. The Rangers took a time-out and from there, scored three times in six minutes ( from the second into the third period) to build the lead the Senators could not overcome.

In game two, the Senators added two players known for fighting to the roster: Matt Carkner and Zenon Konopka, changes described by coach MacLean as done in response to the Rangers' Brian Boyle's rough treatment of Erik Karlsson. After only two minutes of play, Carkner was ejected from the game for fighting Boyle, who did not want to fight Carkner, and punching him after Boyle went down to the ice. The Rangers' Brandon Dubinsky jumped into the fight and was ejected for being the third man into a fight. In the second period, the Rangers' Carl Hagelin elbowed Alfredsson and was ejected. In the game itself, the Rangers took a one-goal lead after one period. The Senators equalized during the match penalty to Hagelin to leave the game tied after two. In the third, Boyle scored to put the Rangers ahead, but Nick Foligno tied the score with four minutes to play. In the overtime, the Senators applied pressure from the start, and Chris Neil scored to win the game for the Senators after only one minute of overtime. For their actions during the game, the NHL later gave Hagelin a three-game suspension, and Carkner a one-game suspension.

Alfredsson did not return for game three, as he was still suffering from a concussion from the Hagelin hit. The first star of the game was the Rangers' goaltender Henrik Lundqvist, who stopped all 39 Senators shots on net for a shutout. The game was scoreless until the third period when the Rangers' Boyle scored on a backhand after the puck bounced off the back boards directly to him nearly in front of the Senators' goaltender Craig Anderson, who stopped 21 of 22 shots. It was the only goal of the match. Lundqvist preserved the win with a save in the final minute on Kyle Turris, who was alone in front of the Rangers' goal with the Senators pressing and their goaltender pulled for an extra attacker.

In game four, it was the Ottawa goalie Anderson's turn to save a game. After giving up two power play goals by the Rangers in the first few minutes, he stopped the Rangers the rest of the way. In the second period, the Senators tied the game on goals by Milan Michalek and Sergei Gonchar. No goals were scored leading to the second overtime of the series. In the overtime, the Senators' Kyle Turris scored his first-ever overtime goal to tie the series after four games, ensuring a game six in Ottawa. Ottawa captain Alfredsson missed another game. It was the first victory at home by the Senators since the 2007 Stanley Cup Final.

The fifth game, in New York, saw Anderson continue to hold off the Rangers, stopping all of their shots for a 2–0 shutout victory. Junior call up Mark Stone made an impression, setting up the winning goal of the game by Spezza in the first period. Spezza added an empty net goal to seal the victory. It was Stone's NHL debut.

Game six was played in Ottawa with the Senators having a chance to eliminate the Rangers. The Senators scored the first goal of the game in the first period on a power play. With Anderson continuing to hold off the Rangers, it appeared the Senators might have scored enough. It all changed in the second period with three goals by the Rangers, including a pair on the power play, to put the Rangers ahead 3–1. Anderson's shutout streak of the Rangers ended at 145 minutes, 27 seconds. In the third, Senators' coach Paul MacLean benched stars Spezza and Alfredsson in a ploy to turn their games around, but it was ineffective. Alfredsson himself showed a rare temper outburst on the bench, due to his frustration. The Senators scored a goal on a disputed play in the last minute, but it was too little, too late. The game was the NHL debut for Senators prospect Jakob Silfverberg, who had just finished playing in the Swedish Elitserien playoffs.

The series shifted to New York for the deciding game seven. Like game six, the deciding goals were scored in the second period. The Rangers scored a pair of goals to go ahead 2–0, while Alfredsson replied on the power play for the Senators. The third period was scoreless. Alfredsson was considered to be the best player for the Senators in the game, and there was considerable speculation after the game that it might be the last game of his NHL career.

Standings

Schedule and results

Pre-season

|- style="text-align:center; background:#fcc;"
| 1 || September 19 || 7:00 pm || Toronto || 2–4 || Lehner || Air Canada Centre || 18,556 ||
|- style="text-align:center; background:#cfc;"
| 2 || September 21 || 7:30 pm || Boston || 2 – 1 (OT) || Auld || Scotiabank Place || 16,492 ||
|- style="text-align:center; background:#fff;"
| 3 || September 23 || 7:30 pm || Montreal || 3 – 4 (SO) || Anderson || Scotiabank Place || 17,583 ||
|- style="text-align:center; background:#cfc;"
| 4 || September 24 || 7:00 pm || Montreal || 3–2 || Lehner || Bell Centre || 21,273 ||
|- style="text-align:center; background:#fcc;"
| 5 || September 26 || 4:00 pm || Winnipeg || 1–3 || Auld || Mile One Centre (St. John's, NFLD) || 6,275 ||
|- style="text-align:center; background:#fcc;"
| 6 || September 27 || 7:30 pm || Toronto || 3–5 || Lehner || Scotiabank Place || 18,831 ||
|- style="text-align:center; background:#cfc;"
| 7 || September 29 || 7:00 pm || Boston || 2–1 || Anderson || TD Garden || 16,763 ||
|-

Regular season

|- style="text-align:center; background:#fcc;"
| 1 || October 7 || 7:00 pm || Detroit || 3–5 || Anderson || Joe Louis Arena || 20,066 || 0–1–0 || 0 ||
|- style="text-align:center; background:#fcc;"
| 2 || October 8 || 7:00 pm || Toronto || 5–6 || Auld || Air Canada Centre || 19,324 || 0–2–0 || 0 ||
|- style="text-align:center; background:#cfc;"
| 3 || October 11 || 7:30 pm || Minnesota || 4 – 3 (SO) || Anderson || Scotiabank Place || 19,455 || 1–2–0 || 2 ||
|- style="text-align:center; background:#fcc;"
| 4 || October 13 || 7:30 pm || Colorado || 1–7 || Anderson || Scotiabank Place || 19,239 || 1–3–0 || 2 ||
|- style="text-align:center; background:#fcc;"
| 5 || October 15 || 7:00 pm || Washington || 1–2 || Auld || Verizon Center || 18,506 || 1–4–0 || 2 ||
|- style="text-align:center; background:#fcc;"
| 6 || October 18 || 7:30 pm || Philadelphia || 2–7 || Auld || Scotiabank Place || 18,059 || 1–5–0 || 2 ||
|- style="text-align:center; background:#cfc;"
| 7 || October 20 || 7:30 pm || Winnipeg || 4–1 || Anderson || Scotiabank Place || 17,919 || 2–5–0 || 4 ||
|- style="text-align:center; background:#cfc;"
| 8 || October 22 || 7:00 pm || Columbus || 4–3 || Anderson || Scotiabank Place || 18,867 || 3–5–0 || 6 ||
|- style="text-align:center; background:#cfc"
| 9 || October 25 || 7:00 pm || Carolina || 3 – 2 (SO) || Anderson || RBC Center || 12,083 || 4–5–0 || 8 ||
|- style="text-align:center; background:#cfc"
| 10 || October 27 || 7:30 pm || Florida || 4–3 || Anderson || Scotiabank Place || 18,165 || 5–5–0 || 10 ||
| 11 ||October 29 || 3:00 pm || NY Rangers || 5 – 4 (SO) || Anderson || Madison Square Garden || 18,200  || 6–5–0 || 12 ||
| 12 || October 30 || 7:30 pm || Toronto || 3–2 || Lehner || Scotiabank Place || 19,522 || 7–5–0 || 14 ||
|-

|- style="text-align:center; background:#fcc;"
| 13 || November 1 || 7:00 pm || Boston || 3–5 || Anderson || TD Garden || 17,565 || 7–6–0 || 14 ||
|- style="text-align:center; background:#fcc;"
| 14 || November 4 || 7:30 pm || Montreal || 1–2 || Anderson || Scotiabank Place || 20,329 || 7–7–0 || 14 ||
|- style="text-align:center; background:#fff;"
| 15 || November 5 || 7:00 pm || Buffalo || 2 – 3 (SO) || Anderson || Scotiabank Place || 18,805 || 7–7–1 || 15 ||
|- style="text-align:center; background:#fcc;"
| 16 || November 9 || 7:30 pm || NY Rangers || 2–3 || Anderson || Scotiabank Place || 19,543 || 7–8–1 || 15 ||
|- style="text-align:center; background:#fcc;"
| 17 || November 11 || 7:30 pm || Buffalo || 1–5 || Anderson || First Niagara Center || 18,690 || 7–9–1 || 15 ||
|- style="text-align:center; background:#cfc;"
| 18 || November 12 || 7:00 pm || Toronto || 5–2 || Anderson || Air Canada Centre || 19,553 || 8–9–1  || 17 ||
|- style="text-align:center; background:#cfc;"
| 19 || November 15 || 9:00 pm || Calgary || 3–1 || Anderson || Scotiabank Saddledome || 19,289 || 9–9–1 || 19 ||
|- style="text-align:center; background:#cfc;"
| 20 || November 17 || 9:30 pm || Edmonton || 5–2 || Anderson || Rexall Place || 16,839 || 10–9–1 || 21 ||
|- style="text-align:center; background:#fff"
| 21 || November 20 || 9:00 pm || Vancouver || 1 – 2 (OT) || Auld || Rogers Arena || 18,890 || 10–9–2 || 22 ||
|- style="text-align:center; background:#fcc;"
| 22 || November 25 || 7:00 pm || Pittsburgh || 3–6 || Anderson || Consol Energy Center || 18,610 || 10–10–2 || 22 ||
|- style="text-align:center; background:#cfc;"
| 23 || November 27 || 5:00 pm || Carolina || 4–3|| Anderson || Scotiabank Place || 19,656 || 11–10–2 || 24 ||
|- style="text-align:center; background:#cfc;"
| 24 || November 29 || 8:30 pm || Winnipeg || 6–4 || Anderson || MTS Centre || 15,004 || 12–10–2 || 26 ||
|-

|-  style="text-align:center; background:#fcc;"
| 25 || December 1 || 8:30 pm || Dallas || 2–3 || Anderson || American Airlines Center || 10,490 || 12–11–2 || 26 ||
|- style="text-align:center; background:#fff;"
| 26 || December 3 || 7:00 pm || Washington || 2 – 3 (OT) || Anderson || Verizon Center || 18,506 || 12–11–3 || 27 ||
|- style="text-align:center; background:#cfc;"
| 27 || December 5 || 7:30 pm || Tampa Bay || 4–2 || Anderson || Scotiabank Place || 18,742 || 13–11–3 || 29 ||
|- style="text-align:center; background:#fcc;"
| 28 || December 7 || 7:00 pm || Washington || 3–5 || Anderson || Scotiabank Place || 17,771 || 13–12–3 || 29 ||
|- style="text-align:center; background:#fff;"
| 29 || December 8 || 7:00 pm || New Jersey || 4 – 5 (SO) || Auld || Prudential Center || 13,743 || 13–12–4 || 30 ||
|- style="text-align:center; background:#fcc;"
| 30 || December 10 || 7:00 pm || Vancouver || 1–4 || Anderson || Scotiabank Place || 19,171 || 13–13–4 || 30 ||
|- style="text-align:center; background:#cfc;"
| 31 || December 13 || 7:00 pm || Buffalo || 3 – 2 (OT) || Anderson || First Niagara Center || 18,690 || 14–13–4 || 32 ||
|- style="text-align:center; background:#fcc;"
| 32 || December 14 || 7:30 pm || Boston || 2–5 || Anderson || Scotiabank Place || 18,088 || 14–14–4 || 32 ||
|- style="text-align:center; background:#cfc;"
| 33 || December 16 || 7:30 pm || Pittsburgh || 6–4 || Auld || Scotiabank Place || 19,710 || 15–14–4 || 34 ||
|- style="text-align:center; background:#cfc;"
| 34 || December 20 || 7:30 pm || Buffalo || 4–1 || Anderson || Scotiabank Place || 18,474 || 16–14–4 || 36 ||
|- style="text-align:center; background:#cfc;"
| 35 || December 22 || 7:30 pm || Florida || 4 – 3 (OT) || Anderson || Scotiabank Place || 19,296 || 17–14–4 || 38 ||
|- style="text-align:center; background:#fff;"
| 36 || December 23 || 7:00 pm || Carolina || 1 – 2 (OT) || Anderson || RBC Center || 14,556 || 17–14–5 || 39 ||
|- style="text-align:center; background:#fcc;"
| 37 || December 27 || 7:30 pm || Montreal || 2–6 || Anderson || Scotiabank Place || 20,500 ||  17–15–5  || 39 ||
|- style="text-align:center; background:#cfc;"
| 38 || December 30 || 7:30 pm || Calgary || 4–3 (OT) || Anderson || Scotiabank Place || 20,500 || 18–15–5 || 41 ||
|- style="text-align:center; background:#cfc;"
| 39 || December 31 || 7:00 pm || Buffalo || 3–2 (SO) || Anderson || First Niagara Center || 18,690 || 19–15–5 || 43 ||
|-

|- style="text-align:center; background:#cfc;"
| 40 || January 2 || 7:30 pm || New Jersey || 3 – 2 (OT) || Anderson || Scotiabank Place || 19,573 || 20–15–5 || 45 ||
|- style="text-align:center; background:#cfc;"
| 41 || January 5 || 7:30 pm || Tampa Bay || 4–1 || Anderson || Scotiabank Place || 19,994 || 21–15–5 || 47 ||
|-style="text-align:center; background:#fff;"
| 42 || January 7 || 1:00 pm || Philadelphia || 2 – 3 (OT) || Anderson || Wells Fargo Center || 19,792 || 21–15–6 || 48 ||
|- style="text-align:center; background:#cfc;"
| 43 || January 8 || 5:00 pm || Philadelphia || 6–4 || Anderson || Scotiabank Place || 20,028 || 22–15–6 || 50 ||
|- style="text-align:center;  background:#cfc;"
| 44 || January 10 || 7:00 pm || Pittsburgh || 5–1 || Anderson || Consol Energy Center || 18,603 || 23–15–6 || 52 ||
|- style="text-align:center;  background:#cfc;"
| 45 || January 12 || 7:00 pm || NY Rangers || 3–0 || Anderson || Madison Square Garden || 18,200 || 24–15–6 || 54 ||
|- style="text-align:center;  background:#cfc;"
| 46 || January 14 || 7:00 pm || Montreal || 3 – 2 (SO) || Anderson || Bell Centre || 21,273 || 25–15–6 || 56 ||
|- style="text-align:center; background:#fcc;"
| 47 || January 16 || 7:30 pm || Winnipeg || 0–2 || Anderson || Scotiabank Place || 19,927 || 25–16–6 || 56 ||
|- style="text-align:center;  background:#cfc;"
| 48 || January 17 || 7:00 pm || Toronto || 3–2 || Anderson || Air Canada Centre || 19,615 || 26–16–6 || 58 ||
|- style="text-align:center; background:#cfc;"
| 49 || January 19 || 10:30 pm || San Jose || 4–1 || Anderson || HP Pavilion || 17,562 || 27–16–6 || 60 ||
|- style="text-align:center; background:#fcc;"
| 50 || January 21 || 4:00 pm || Anaheim || 1–2 || Anderson || Honda Center || 15,500 || 27–17–6 || 60 ||
|- style="text-align:center; background:#fcc;"
| 51 || January 23 || 10:30 pm || Los Angeles || 1–4 || Anderson || Staples Center || 18,118 || 27–18–6 || 60 ||
|- style="text-align:center; background:#fcc;"
| 52 || January 24 || 9:00 pm || Phoenix || 2–3 || Anderson || Jobing.com Arena || 8,061 || 27–19–6 || 60 ||
|- style="text-align:center; background:#fcc;"
| 53 || January 31 || 7:00 pm || Boston || 3–4 || Anderson || TD Garden || 17,565 || 27–20–6 || 60 ||
|-

|- style="text-align:center; background:#fff;"
| 54 || February 3 || 7:30 pm || NY Islanders || 1 – 2 (OT) || Anderson ||  Scotiabank Place || 18,252 || 27–20–7 || 61 ||
|- style="text-align:center; background:#fcc;"
| 55 || February 4 || 7:00 pm || Toronto || 0–5 || Anderson || Scotiabank Place || 20,500 || 27–21–7 || 61 ||
|- style="text-align:center; background:#fcc;"
| 56 || February 7 || 7:30 pm || St. Louis || 1–3 || Anderson || Scotiabank Place || 18,952 || 27–22–7 || 61 ||
|- style="text-align:center; background:#cfc;"
| 57 || February 9 || 7:30 pm || Nashville || 4–3 || Auld || Scotiabank Place || 18,592 || 28–22–7 || 63 ||
|- style="text-align:center; background:#fff;"
| 58 || February 11 || 2:00 pm || Edmonton || 3 – 4 (OT) || Anderson || Scotiabank Place || 20,085 || 28–22–8 || 64 ||
|- style="text-align:center; background:#cfc;"
| 59 || February 14 || 7:00 pm || Tampa Bay || 4–0 || Anderson || St. Pete Times Forum || 17,488 || 29–22–8 || 66 ||
|- style="text-align:center; background:#cfc;"
| 60 || February 15 || 7:30 pm || Florida || 6–2 || Anderson || BankAtlantic Center || 14,038 || 30–22–8 || 68 ||
|- style="text-align:center; background:#cfc; "
| 61 || February 20 || 1:00 pm || NY Islanders || 6–0 || Anderson || Nassau Veterans Memorial Coliseum || 15,818 || 31–22–8 || 70 ||
|- style="text-align:center; background:#cfc;"
| 62 || February 22 || 7:00 pm || Washington || 5–2 || Anderson || Scotiabank Place || 18,357 || 32–22–8 || 72 ||
|- style="text-align:center; background:#fcc;"
| 63 || February 25 || 7:00 pm || Boston || 3–5 || Auld || Scotiabank Place || 19,444 || 32–23–8 || 72 ||
|- style="text-align:center; background:#cfc;"
| 64 || February 26 || 5:00 pm || NY Islanders || 5–2 || Lehner || Scotiabank Place || 19,660 || 33–23–8 || 74 ||
|- style="text-align:center; background:#cfc;"
| 65 || February 28 || 7:00 pm || Boston || 1–0 || Lehner || TD Garden || 17,565 || 34–23–8 || 76 ||
|-

|- style="text-align:center; background:#fcc;"
| 66 || March 2 || 7:00 pm || Chicago || 1–2 || Lehner || Scotiabank Place || 18,788 || 34–24–8 || 76 ||
|- style="text-align:center; background:#fcc;"
| 67 || March 4 || 6:00 pm || Florida || 2–4 || Lehner || BankAtlantic Center || 15,811 || 34–25–8 || 76 ||
|- style="text-align:center; background:#cfc;"
| 68 || March 6 || 7:30 pm || Tampa Bay || 7–3 || Bishop || St. Pete Times Forum || 18,967 || 35–25–8 || 78 ||
|- style="text-align:center; background:#cfc;"
| 69 || March 8 || 7:30 pm || NY Rangers || 4–1 || Bishop || Scotiabank Place || 18,854 || 36–25–8 || 80 ||
|- style="text-align:center; background:#fff;"
| 70 || March 10 || 7:00 pm || Buffalo || 3 – 4 (SO) || Bishop || Scotiabank Place || 19,951 || 36–25–9 || 81 ||
|- style="text-align:center; background:#fff;"
| 71 || March 14 || 7:30 pm || Montreal || 2 – 3 (SO) || Bishop || Bell Centre || 21,273 || 36–25–10 || 82 ||
|- style="text-align:center; background:#cfc;"
| 72 || March 16 || 7:00 pm || Montreal || 2 – 1 (OT) || Bishop || Scotiabank Place || 20,500 || 37–25–10 || 84 ||
|- style="text-align:center; background:#fcc;"
| 73 || March 17 || 7:00 pm || Toronto || 1–3 || Bishop || Scotiabank Place || 20,500 || 37–26–10 || 84 ||
|- style="text-align:center; background:#fcc;"
| 74 || March 20 || 7:30 pm || New Jersey || 0–1 || Bishop || Scotiabank Place || 19,834 || 37–27–10 || 84  ||
|- style="text-align:center; background:#fcc;"
| 75 || March 23 || 7:30 pm || Montreal || 1–5 || Anderson || Bell Centre || 21,273 || 37–28–10 || 84 ||
|- style="text-align:center; background:#cfc;"
| 76 || March 24 || 7:00 pm || Pittsburgh || 8–4 || Anderson || Scotiabank Place || 20,076 || 38–28–10 || 86 ||
|- style="text-align:center; background:#cfc;"
| 77 || March 26 || 8:30 pm || Winnipeg || 6–4 || Anderson || MTS Centre || 15,004 || 39–28–10 || 88 ||
|- style="text-align:center; background:#cfc;"
| 78 || March 31 || 1:00 pm || Philadelphia || 4 – 3 (SO) || Anderson || Wells Fargo Center || 19,822 || 40–28–10 || 90 ||
|-

|- style="text-align:center; background:#cfc;"
| 79 || April 1 || 3:00 pm || NY Islanders || 5–1 || Anderson || Nassau Veterans Memorial Coliseum || 14,210 || 41–28–10 || 92 ||
|- style="text-align:center; background:#fcc;"
| 80 || April 3 || 7:30 pm || Carolina || 1–2 || Anderson || Scotiabank Place || 19,484 || 41–29–10 || 92 ||
|- style="text-align:center; background:#fcc;"
| 81 || April 5 || 7:30 pm || Boston || 1–3 || Bishop || Scotiabank Place || 20,500 || 41–30–10 || 92 ||
|- style="text-align:center; background:#fcc;"
| 82 || April 7 || 3:00 pm || New Jersey || 2–4 || Anderson || Prudential Center || 17,625 || 41–31–10 || 92 ||
|-

Playoffs

|-  style="text-align:center; background:#fcc;"
| 1 || April 12 || 7 pm || 2–4 || Anderson || Madison Square Garden || 18,200 || 0–1  ||
|-  style="text-align:center; background:#cfc;"
| 2 || April 14 || 7 pm || 3–2 (OT) || Anderson || Madison Square Garden || 18,200 || 1–1 ||
|-  style="text-align:center; background:#fcc;"
| 3 || April 16 || 7:30 pm || 0–1 || Anderson || Scotiabank Place || 20,182 || 1–2 ||
|-  style="text-align:center; background:#cfc;"
| 4 || April 18 || 7:30 pm || 3–2 (OT) || Anderson || Scotiabank Place || 20,340 || 2–2 ||
|-  style="text-align:center; background:#cfc;"
| 5 || April 21 || 7 pm || 2–0 || Anderson || Madison Square Garden || 18,200 || 3–2 ||
|-  style="text-align:center; background:#fcc;"
| 6 || April 23 || 7 pm || 2–3 || Anderson || Scotiabank Place || 20,500 || 3–3 ||
|-  style="text-align:center; background:#fcc;"
| 7 || April 26 || 7 pm || 1–2 || Anderson || Madison Square Garden || 18,200 || 3–4 ||
|-
| style="text-align:left;" colspan=9 | Notes:S.Sell-out (over 19,153 at Scotiabank Place).
|-

Player statistics
Source: Ottawa Senators.
Source: NHL.

Scoring

As of April 8, 2012.

Goaltending
Source: NHL.

†Denotes player spent time with another team before joining Senators. Stats reflect time with Senators only.
‡Traded mid-season.

Awards/Milestones

Awards

NHL awards

Records
The Senators set a new franchise record for the fastest two goals scored on October 8, 2011, in a 6–5 loss to the Toronto Maple Leafs at the Air Canada Centre. The first goal was scored by Jason Spezza at 15:36 of the third period, while the second goal was scored eight seconds later by Daniel Alfredsson.  The previous record was nine seconds, set the previous season.

On February 22, 2012, Erik Karlsson set a new franchise record for assists by a defenceman in a single season by tallying two assists, bringing his total to 47, in a 5–2 victory over the Washington Capitals. The previous record was held by Norm MacIver, who tallied 46 assists during the modern franchise's inaugural season in 1992–93.

On February 26, 2012, Erik Karlsson set a new franchise record for points by a defenceman in a single season by tallying two assists, bringing his points total to 65, in a 5–2 victory over the New York Islanders. The previous record was held by Norm MacIver, who tallied 63 points during the modern franchise's inaugural season in 1992–93.

Milestones

Transactions

Trades

Notes

Free agents signed

Free agents lost

Claimed via waivers

Lost via waivers

Player signings

Draft picks 
The 2011 NHL Entry Draft was held in Saint Paul, Minnesota. The Senators picked sixth overall with their own draft pick, and 21st overall with the first-round pick of the Nashville Predators, acquired in exchange for a 2011 trade of Mike Fisher.  After picking 21st, the Senators traded their 35th and 48th overall picks (the later pick acquired from the Chicago Blackhawks in exchange for Chris Campoli) to the Detroit Red Wings in exchange for the 24th overall pick.  This marked the first time in franchise history that the Senators picked three times in the first round.

See also 
 2011–12 NHL season

References

Ottawa Senators seasons
Ottawa Senators season, 2011-12
National Hockey League All-Star Game hosts
Ottawa